|}

The Prix de l'Opéra is a Group 1 flat horse race in France open to thoroughbred fillies and mares aged three years or older. It is run at Longchamp over a distance of 2,000 metres (about 1¼ miles), and it is scheduled to take place each year in early October.

History
The event was established in 1974, and it was initially classed at Group 2 level. It was originally restricted to three and four-year-old fillies and contested over 1,850 metres.

The race was opened to older mares in 1990. It was extended to 2,000 metres and promoted to Group 1 status in 2000.

The Prix de l'Opéra was added to the Breeders' Cup Challenge series in 2011. The winner now earns an automatic invitation to compete in the same year's Breeders' Cup Filly & Mare Turf.

The race is currently held on the first Sunday in October, the same day as the Prix de l'Arc de Triomphe.

Records
Most successful horse (2 wins):
 Athyka – 1988, 1989

Leading jockey (3 wins):
 Yves Saint-Martin – Sea Sands (1975), Waya (1977), Kilmona (1981)
 Walter Swinburn – Royal Heroine (1983), Bella Colora (1985), Hatoof (1992)
 Cash Asmussen – Secret Form (1986), Colour Chart (1990), Insight (1998)
 Christophe Soumillon – Terre a Terre (2001), Mandesha (2006), Dalkala (2013)

Leading trainer (5 wins):
 Criquette Head-Maarek – Reine Mathilde (1984), Mona Stella (1987), Athyka (1988, 1989), Hatoof (1992)

Leading owner (4 wins):
 HH Aga Khan IV – Timarida (1995), Shalanaya (2009), Ridasiyna (2012), Dalkala (2013)

Winners

See also
 List of French flat horse races

References

 France Galop (1979–1989) / Racing Post (1990–present) :

 galop.courses-france.com:
 1974–1979, 1980–1999, 2000–2009

 france-galop.com – A Brief History: Prix de l'Opéra.
 galopp-sieger.de – Prix de l'Opéra.
 horseracingintfed.com – International Federation of Horseracing Authorities – Prix de l'Opéra (2018).
 pedigreequery.com – Prix de l'Opéra – Longchamp.

Middle distance horse races for fillies and mares
Longchamp Racecourse
Horse races in France
Breeders' Cup Challenge series
Recurring sporting events established in 1974
1974 establishments in France